Cymdeithas Cymreigyddion y Fenni, which translates as the Abergavenny Welsh Society, is a Welsh language society in Abergavenny. Early in its history it was very influential in the survival of the language in Monmouthshire, and in Welsh intellectual life more broadly.

Motto
The society's motto is Oes y byd i'r iaith Gymraeg, which translates as "long live the Welsh language", or more literally "the age of the world to the Welsh language".

Founding
The society was founded on 2 November 1833, in the Sun Inn, Abergavenny, with the purpose of providing its members with the opportunity to socialise in Welsh, and to secure the use of the language more broadly in the town. It was one of several Welsh societies in this period to adopt the name "Cymreigyddion", seemingly in imitation of the London-based Cymreigyddion Society.

The society's founding members were:

President: Rev. John Evans, the vicar of Llanover
Vice-President: William Price, a solicitor in Abergavenny
Secretary: Thomas Bevan
Non-Portfolio Members: T. E. Watkins and Eiddil Ifor.

The society soon attracted the attention of various members of the local aristocracy. These included Charles Morgan, Benjamin Hall, his wife Augusta, Georgina Waddington, and Lady Elizabeth Coffin-Greenly of Titley Court, Hereford.

Another early member of the society was the Welsh poet and scholar, Rev. Thomas Price, known better today by his bardic name Carnhuanawc.

The society was fundamental in the establishment of the Welsh Manuscripts Society in 1837.

Today
The society still meets several times a year in Llanfoist, and is now one of several Welsh language groups locally, including Cymdeithas Gwenynen Gwent and Merched y Wawr.

References

External links 
Official Website
Eiddil Ifor's medals
Mr. Walter Morgan's Membership Certificate
Society Archives

Notes

Article in Welsh

Welsh language
Celtic language advocacy organizations